Kawhi Anthony Leonard (born June 29, 1991) is an American professional basketball player for the Los Angeles Clippers of the National Basketball Association (NBA). A two-time NBA champion, he is a five-time All-Star with three All-NBA First Team selections. Nicknamed the "Claw" or "Klaw" for his ball-hawking skills, he has earned seven All-Defensive Team selections and won Defensive Player of the Year honors in 2015 and 2016. In 2021, he was named to the NBA 75th Anniversary Team.

Leonard played two seasons of college basketball for the San Diego State Aztecs and was named a consensus second-team All-American as a sophomore. He opted to forgo his final two seasons of college eligibility to enter the 2011 NBA draft. He was selected by the Indiana Pacers with the 15th overall pick before being traded to the San Antonio Spurs on draft night.

With the Spurs, Leonard won an NBA championship in 2014, when he was named the Finals Most Valuable Player. After seven seasons with the Spurs, Leonard was traded to the Toronto Raptors in 2018. In 2019, he led the Raptors to their first NBA championship in franchise history and won his second Finals MVP award (one of only three players to win Finals MVP with multiple teams, along with Kareem Abdul-Jabbar and LeBron James). He subsequently moved to his hometown of Los Angeles and signed with the Clippers as a free agent in July 2019.

High school career
Leonard attended Canyon Springs High School in Moreno Valley, California, before transferring to Martin Luther King High School for his junior year. In his senior year there, he and Tony Snell led the King High Wolves to a 30–3 record. Leonard averaged 22.6 points, 13.1 rebounds, 3.9 assists, and 3 blocks per game that year and was named California Mr. Basketball.

Considered a four-star recruit by Rivals.com, Leonard was listed in the recruiting rankings of 2009 as the No. 8 small forward and the No. 48 player nationwide.

College career
As a freshman at San Diego State University in 2009–10, Leonard averaged 12.7 points and 9.9 rebounds per game for the Aztecs. He helped the team achieve a 25–9 record and led them to win the Mountain West Conference (MWC) tournament title. The Aztecs thus received an automatic bid to the NCAA tournament but would lose in the first round to Tennessee, 62–59, with Leonard recording 12 points and 10 rebounds. He led the MWC in rebounding and was named MWC Freshman of the Year, First Team All-MWC, and the 2010 MWC tournament MVP.

During his sophomore season, Leonard averaged 15.7 points and 10.4 rebounds per contest as the Aztecs finished with a 34–3 record and won back-to-back conference tournament championships. Led by Leonard, San Diego State once again made the NCAA tournament. This time the Aztecs advanced to the Sweet 16, but then they lost to eventual national champions, Connecticut. Leonard was named to the Second Team All-America and left San Diego State to enter the 2011 NBA draft.

On February 1, 2020, San Diego State retired Leonard's number 15, making him the first Aztecs men's basketball player to have his jersey raised to the rafters. It was the third number retirement in program history, after Michael Cage (44) and Milton “Milky” Phelps (22).

Professional career
According to Sports Illustrated, NBA scouts were aware in 2011 that Leonard had a strong work ethic and was a "physical marvel, 6'7" with a 7'3" wingspan and 11-inch hands, too strong to screen and too long to elude". Nevertheless, they found him "difficult to pin down". Sporting News has asserted that Leonard was known more for his defense and rebounding than for his offensive capabilities when he first entered the league. He was compared to Metta World Peace and Gerald Wallace, and his outside shooting (or lack thereof) was a concern.

San Antonio Spurs (2011–2018)

2011–13: Rookie year and first Finals appearance
Leonard was selected with the 15th overall pick in the 2011 NBA draft by the Indiana Pacers but was traded that night to the San Antonio Spurs along with the rights to Erazem Lorbek and Dāvis Bertāns in exchange for George Hill. On December 10, 2011, following the conclusion of the NBA lockout, he signed a multi-year deal with the Spurs.

Leonard and teammate Tiago Splitter were selected to play in the 2012 Rising Stars Challenge as members of Team Chuck. Although he suited up for the event, he did not play due to a calf strain. After starter Richard Jefferson was traded to the Golden State Warriors for Stephen Jackson, Leonard was promoted to the starting small forward position while Jackson served as his backup.

At season's end, Leonard placed fourth in Rookie of the Year voting and was named to the 2012 NBA All-Rookie First Team.

In the summer of 2012, Leonard was among several NBA up-and-comers chosen to play for the 2012 USA men's basketball Select Team. They trained with the Olympic team, which included Kobe Bryant, LeBron James, Kevin Durant, and Chris Paul.

On October 26, 2012, the Spurs exercised the team option on Leonard, re-signing him through the 2013–14 season.

Leonard was selected to play for the BBVA Rising Stars Challenge where he was once again drafted to Team Chuck. He recorded 20 points and 7 rebounds as Team Chuck defeated Team Shaq for the second straight year 163–135.

The San Antonio Spurs advanced to the NBA Finals where they faced the Miami Heat. Leonard averaged 14.6 points and 11.1 rebounds during the Finals as the Spurs lost the series in seven games.

2013–14: NBA championship and Finals MVP

On April 6, 2014, Leonard scored a season-high 26 points in the Spurs' 112–92 win over the Memphis Grizzlies. He finished the season averaging 12.8 points, 6.2 rebounds, 2.0 assists, 1.7 steals while shooting 52.2% from the field. Leonard helped the Spurs to a 62–20 record – the number one seed in the NBA – and was named to the NBA All-Defensive Second Team for the first time.

The Spurs and the Miami Heat met once again in the NBA Finals. On June 10, 2014, in Game 3 of the series, Leonard scored a then career-high 29 points in a 111–92 victory. San Antonio went on to win the series 4–1. Leonard averaged 17.8 points on 61% shooting and was named NBA Finals MVP. He was the third-youngest winner of the award (22 years and 351 days), behind only Magic Johnson—who won in both 1980 (20 years and 278 days) and 1982 (22 years and 298 days). Leonard was also only the sixth player, and the first since Chauncey Billups in 2004, to win Finals MVP in a season in which they were not an All-Star.

2014–15: Defensive Player of the Year
After missing the final six preseason games and the season opener against the Dallas Mavericks due to an infection in his right eye caused by conjunctivitis, Leonard made his season debut against the Phoenix Suns on October 31 despite still suffering from blurry vision. He continued to play through the blurred vision and on November 10, 2014, he scored a season-high 26 points in the Spurs' 89–85 win over the Los Angeles Clippers. Following a three-game stint on the sidelines between December 17 and 20, Leonard had an injection in his injured right hand on December 22 and was ruled out indefinitely. He returned to action on January 16, 2015, after missing 15 games, recording 20 points, 4 rebounds, 5 assists and 3 steals to lead the Spurs to a 110–96 win over the Portland Trail Blazers.

On April 5, Leonard recorded 26 points and a career-high 7 steals in a 107–92 win over the Golden State Warriors. On April 23, Leonard was named the NBA Defensive Player of the Year, joining Michael Jordan and Hakeem Olajuwon as the only players to win both NBA Defensive Player of the Year and NBA Finals MVP. The next day, he scored a playoff career-high 32 points in a Game 3 first-round victory over the Los Angeles Clippers. The Spurs went on to lose the series in seven games.

2015–16: First All-Star, MVP runner-up and second DPOY award
On July 16, 2015, Leonard re-signed with the Spurs to a five-year, $90 million contract. On October 28, he tied his career-high 32 points in a 112–106 season-opening loss to the Oklahoma City Thunder. On December 3, he scored 27 points and made a career-high seven three-pointers in a 103–83 win over the Memphis Grizzlies. On January 21, 2016, he was named as a starter to the Western Conference team for the 2016 All-Star Game, earning his first All-Star selection and became the sixth Spurs player in franchise history to be selected as an All-Star starter, joining George Gervin, Larry Kenon, Alvin Robertson, David Robinson and Tim Duncan.

On March 23, 2016, Leonard had another 32-point outing in a 112–88 win over the Miami Heat, helping the Spurs extend their franchise-record home winning streak to 45 games (dating to 2014–15 season). On April 2, he set a new career-high with 33 points in a 102–95 win over the Toronto Raptors, helping the Spurs set a franchise record with their 64th victory. The Spurs topped their 63-win season in 2005–06 and extended their NBA-record home winning streak to start the season to 39 games. Leonard helped the Spurs finish second in the Western Conference with a 67–15 record, and earned Defensive Player of the Year honors for a second straight year, becoming the first non-center to win the honor in back-to-back seasons since Dennis Rodman in 1989–90 and 1990–91. Additionally, he finished runner-up in the MVP voting behind Stephen Curry.

In Game 3 of the first-round playoffs against the Memphis Grizzlies, Leonard helped the Spurs go up 3–0 in the series with a 32-point effort, tying his playoff career-high. After sweeping the Grizzlies, the Spurs moved on to face the Oklahoma City Thunder in the second round. In Game 3 of the series against the Thunder, Leonard helped his team go up 2–1 with 31 points and 11 rebounds. However, the Spurs went on to lose the next three games, bowing out of the playoffs with a 4–2 defeat.

2016–17: Second All-NBA First Team selection

In the Spurs' season opener on October 25, 2016, Leonard recorded a career-high 35 points and five steals in a 129–100 win over the Golden State Warriors. On January 14, 2017, he set a new career high with 38 points in a 108–105 loss to the Phoenix Suns, becoming the first Spur to record three consecutive 30-point games since Tony Parker in 2012. On January 19, he was named a starter for the Western Conference All-Star team in the 2017 NBA All-Star Game and had 34 points against the Denver Nuggets for his fifth straight 30-point performance. Two days later, he set a new career high with 41 points in a 118–115 overtime win over the Cleveland Cavaliers, becoming the first San Antonio player to score at least 30 in six straight games since Mike Mitchell in 1986. He subsequently earned Western Conference Player of the Week honors for games played from January 16 through 22.

On February 13, 2017, Leonard made 13 of 23 shots including two three-pointers and finished with 32 points, six rebounds and four steals in a 110–106 win over the Indiana Pacers. It was his fifth straight 30-point game. With their 42nd victory of the season coming against the Pacers, the Spurs extended their streak of consecutive winning seasons to a league-record 20. On March 6, after being named Player of the Week for the fourth time in his career, Leonard scored 39 points to lead the Spurs to a 112–110 win over the Houston Rockets. It was his 91st straight game scoring in double figures, matching San Antonio's longest streak since Tim Duncan did so in 2002–03.

On April 15, 2017, Leonard matched his postseason high with 32 points in a 111–82 victory over the Memphis Grizzlies in Game 1 of their first-round playoff series. Two days later, in Game 2, Leonard had a postseason career-high 37 points and added 11 rebounds in a 96–82 win over Memphis to take a 2–0 series lead. In Game 4 of the series in Memphis, Leonard had another postseason personal best with 43 points in a 110–108 overtime loss; the loss tied the series at 2–2. Behind a 29-point effort from Leonard in Game 6, the Spurs advanced to the Western Conference semifinals by beating Memphis 103–96 to take the series 4–2. The Spurs went on to advance to the Western Conference Finals with a 4–2 triumph over the Houston Rockets in the second round, despite playing without Leonard in Game 6 due to an ankle injury.

In the third quarter of Game 1 of the Western Conference Finals against the Golden State Warriors, Leonard landed on Zaza Pachulia's foot after attempting a field goal and re-aggravated his existing ankle injury. He exited the game with 26 points and sat out the remainder of the series as the Spurs lost to the Warriors in four games. Leonard finished the season with averages of 25.5 points, 5.8 rebounds, 3.5 assists and 1.8 steals per game in the regular season, and 27.7 points, 7.8 rebounds, 4.6 assists and 1.7 steals for the playoffs. He was subsequently selected to the All-NBA First Team for the second straight year, as well as earning All-Defensive First Team honors for the third consecutive season.

2017–18: Injury-plagued season
Leonard missed the first 27 games of the season with a right quadriceps injury, making his season debut on December 12, 2017, against the Dallas Mavericks. He appeared in nine games between December 12 and January 13. He returned from a three-game absence on January 13 against the Denver Nuggets after straining his left shoulder against the Phoenix Suns on January 5. On January 17, he was ruled out for an indefinite period of time to continue his rehabilitation process from right quadriceps tendinopathy. Leonard was subsequently cleared to play by the Spurs medical staff, but he solicited a second opinion from his own doctors. In March, the Spurs held a players-only meeting in which Leonard's teammates reportedly entreated him to return to the court; the meeting was described as "tense and emotional". Leonard did not play again in 2018.

Toronto Raptors (2018–2019)

2018–19: Second NBA championship and Finals MVP

In June 2018, reports surfaced claiming that Leonard had requested a trade from the Spurs and that he did so after months of tension between his camp and the Spurs stemming from a disagreement over his injury rehabilitation program. A month later, on July 18, Leonard and teammate Danny Green were traded to the Toronto Raptors in exchange for DeMar DeRozan, Jakob Pöltl and a protected 2019 first-round draft pick. It was a risky move for the Raptors and their president, Masai Ujiri, given the concerns over Leonard's health and the possibility of him leaving as a free agent at the end of the season. In his debut for the Raptors in their season opener on October 17, Leonard had 24 points and 12 rebounds in a 116–104 win over the Cleveland Cavaliers. Two days later, he had 31 points and 10 rebounds in a 113–101 win over the Boston Celtics.

Leonard was named Eastern Conference Player of the Week for games played November 26 – December 2. On January 1, 2019, he scored a career-high 45 points in a 122–116 win over the Utah Jazz. On January 31, against the Milwaukee Bucks, Leonard's career-high streak of scoring at least 20 points in 22 consecutive games ended when he had 16 points in a 105–92 loss.

In Game 1 of the Eastern Conference semifinals against the Philadelphia 76ers, Leonard had a playoff career-high 45 points, on 16-of-23 (69.6%) shooting, to lead the Raptors in a 108–95 victory. He became just the second player in Raptors history to eclipse 40 points in a playoff game, joining Vince Carter (50 points, 2001). In the deciding Game 7, Leonard hit a shot from the corner at the buzzer that bounced off the rim four times before falling to give the Raptors a 92–90 victory over the 76ers to advance to the Eastern Conference Finals. He finished the game with 41 points on 16-of-39 shooting. This was the first Game 7 buzzer beater in NBA history and caused the normally calm Leonard to let out a victorious scream as he was swarmed by his teammates. Leonard said of the shot afterward: "It was great. That's something I've never experienced before, Game 7, game-winning shot. It was a blessing to be able to get to that point and make that shot and feel that moment. It's something I can look back on in my career." 

The Raptors continued their 2019 NBA playoffs march against the top-seeded Milwaukee Bucks. In Game 3 of the Eastern Conference Finals, Leonard scored 36 points, including eight in the second overtime, to help the Raptors beat Milwaukee 118–112 to cut the Bucks' series lead to 2–1. In Game 5, he helped the Raptors take a 3–2 lead with 35 points on five 3-pointers to go with seven rebounds and nine assists in a 105–99 win. In Game 6, he had 27 points and 17 rebounds to lead the Raptors into the NBA Finals for the first time with a 100–94 victory. Leonard put an exclamation point on the conference victory with a huge dunk on Giannis Antetokounmpo that was set up by a Kyle Lowry steal.

Leonard led the Raptors into the 2019 Finals on the back of what was being described as an all-time great NBA playoff performance. In Game 2, Leonard had 34 points and 14 rebounds in a 109–104 loss to the Golden State Warriors. Leonard helped the Raptors take a 3–1 series lead with 36 points and 12 rebounds in a 105–92 Game 4 win on the road in Oakland. In Game 6, he scored 22 points in a 114–110 win to help lift the Raptors to a 4–2 series victory in claiming his second NBA championship. He was subsequently named NBA Finals MVP for the second time, becoming just the third Finals MVP to have won the award with two teams, joining LeBron James and Kareem Abdul-Jabbar. He is also the first person to win Finals MVP with a team from each conference. Leonard scored 732 points during the 2019 playoffs; this was the third-best scoring total for a single NBA postseason in league history, behind only LeBron James (748, 2018) and Michael Jordan (759, 1992).

Los Angeles Clippers (2019–present)

2019–20: All-Star Game MVP
On July 10, 2019, Leonard signed with his hometown team, the Los Angeles Clippers, to a reported three-year, $103 million contract, which included an opt-out clause in 2021. Leonard debuted for the Clippers on October 22, 2019, where he put up 30 points, 6 rebounds, and 5 assists in a 112–102 win over the Los Angeles Lakers. On October 24, he recorded 21 points and tied a career-high 9 assists in a 141–122 win over the Golden State Warriors. On December 11, Leonard returned to Toronto for the first since joining the Clippers and was met with a tribute and a standing ovation from the crowd before scoring 23 points and recording six assists in 112–92 win over the Raptors. Two days later, Leonard scored a then season-high 42 points along with 11 rebounds in a 124–117 win over the Minnesota Timberwolves. It was the first time in franchise history that two players eclipsed 40 points, as teammate Paul George scored 46 points. On Christmas Day, the Clippers and Lakers met once again in a much anticipated matchup, in which Leonard put up 35 points on 11-of-19 shooting and 12 rebounds to lead the Clippers to a 111–106 comeback win despite trailing by as much as 15. On January 14, 2020, Leonard scored a season-high 43 points in just 29 minutes in a 128–103 win over the Cleveland Cavaliers. He was named Western Conference Player of the Week for games played from January 13 through 19. On January 24, Leonard recorded his first career triple-double with 33 points, 10 rebounds, and 10 assists (a new career-high) in a 122–117 win over the Miami Heat. On February 16, Leonard was named the NBA All-Star Game MVP of the 2020 NBA All-Star Game.

After the 2019–20 NBA season was suspended on March 11 due to the COVID-19 pandemic, Leonard and the Clippers returned to action in the NBA Bubble at Walt Disney World in Bay Lake, Florida, near Orlando on July 30. Leonard played six out of the team's eight seeding games and was eventually selected to the NBA's All-Bubble Second Team, averaging 28.8 points, 4.8 rebounds and 4.3 assists.  In the first round of the 2020 NBA playoffs, the Clippers eliminated the Dallas Mavericks in six games while Leonard recorded over 30 points in five consecutive games and averaged 32.8 points, 10.2 rebounds, and 5.2 assists for the series. The Clippers were eliminated by the Denver Nuggets in the Western Conference semifinals, losing in seven games after surrendering a 3–1 series lead. In Game 7, Leonard performed poorly, scoring only 14 points while shooting 6-of-22 from the field. Leonard was selected to his fourth All-NBA Team.

2020–21: Season ended with injury
In the Clippers' season opener on December 22, 2020, Leonard recorded 26 points and two steals in a 116–109 win over the Los Angeles Lakers. On December 25, in the fourth quarter of a game against the Denver Nuggets, Leonard received an elbow to the face from teammate Serge Ibaka, causing a facial injury which forced Leonard out of the game early. Leonard suffered a wound in his mouth as a result of his injury, which required him to get eight stitches. After being absent for two games due to the injury, Leonard returned to the Clippers wearing a clear plastic mask with a 128–105 win over the Portland Trail Blazers on December 30, recording a game-high 28 points and seven assists.

Playing in 52 out of the 72 regular season games, Leonard led the Clippers to a 47–25 record and the fourth-place finish in the Western Conference. For the season he averaged 24.8 points, 6.5 rebounds and a career-high 5.2 assists. After his stellar play on both ends of the floor, he was awarded with his seventh All-Defensive Team selection and fifth All-NBA Team selection third All-NBA First Team. In the first round of the 2021 NBA playoffs the Clippers faced the Dallas Mavericks for the rematch of the previous year. After losing the first two games at home, the Clippers bounced back with Leonard scoring 36 and 29 points respectively in games played in Dallas to even the series. After dropping Game 5, Leonard led the Clippers in the elimination Game 6, tying his career-high 45 points and subsequently recorded 28 points, 10 rebounds, nine assists and four steals in the decisive Game 7 win, to advance to the next round.

In the Western Conference Semifinals the Clippers were again facing a 0–2 deficit at the beginning of the series, this time to the first-seeded Utah Jazz. Leonard led another comeback while scoring 34 and 31 points respectively in convincing victories at home to even the series. He, however, got injured at the end of Game 4 after being fouled by Joe Ingles. Leonard was ruled out for the remainder of the series with a knee sprain, as the Clippers won the next two games and advanced to the first Western Conference Finals in franchise history. The Clippers' playoffs run was then cut short by the Phoenix Suns in six games, with Leonard unable to recover and missing the entire series. On July 13, Leonard underwent surgery to repair a partial tear of the ACL in his right knee.

2021–22: Year absence
After opting out of the final year of his original contract, Leonard re-signed with the Clippers on August 12, 2021 to a max four-year, $176.3 million contract with the fourth year being a player option. Leonard remained inactive the entire season after recovering from his partial tear the ACL in his right knee. Without Leonard, the Clippers finished the season 42–40 and qualified for the play-in tournament, but failed to qualify for the playoffs after being defeated by both the Minnesota Timberwolves and the New Orleans Pelicans.

2022–23: Return from injury
Leonard made his return from injury on October 3, 2022, putting up 11 points, four rebounds, two assists, and two steals in a 102–97 preseason win over the Trail Blazers. On October 20, Leonard made his regular season return, logging 14 points, seven rebounds, and two assists off the bench in a 103–97 win over the Los Angeles Lakers. On December 5, Leonard put up a game-winner in a 119–117 win over the Charlotte Hornets. On December 12, Leonard recorded 25 points on 10-of-12 shooting, nine rebounds and six assists, as the Clippers beat the Boston Celtics 113–93.

On January 10, 2023, Leonard scored 33 points on 9-of-12 shooting, 3-of-5 from three and 12-of-12 from the free throw line, along with nine rebounds, four assists and four steals in an 113–101 win over the Dallas Mavericks. On January 20, Leonard scored a then season-high 36 points on 13-of-18 shooting, 4-of-5 from three and 6-of-6 from the free throw line and delivered seven assists in an 131–126 win over his former team, the San Antonio Spurs. On February 14, Leonard scored 33 points, tying his career high with seven three-pointers in a 134–124 win over the reigning champions Golden State Warriors. He was 12-of-17 from the floor, 7-of-9 from the three-point range and made both of his free throws in 34 minutes. On February 24, Leonard scored a season-high 44 points on 16-of-22 shooting, 6-of-9 from three, 6-of-6 from the free throw line in a 176–175 double overtime loss against the Sacramento Kings. It was the second-highest scoring game in NBA history.

Player profile

Leonard is regarded as one of the best perimeter defenders in the NBA, thanks to his combination of athleticism, size and intelligence. Highly versatile, he is capable of guarding at least three positions, and has frequently been deployed against the opposing team's star player. In 2021, to commemorate the NBA's 75th Anniversary The Athletic ranked their top 75 players of all time, and named Leonard as the 34th greatest player in NBA history.

Known early in his career primarily as an elite defender and floor spacer, Leonard began taking on a larger offensive responsibility from the 2015–16 season on and quickly established himself as one of the most efficient scorers in the league. He has developed a versatile offensive game, capable of hitting shots reliably from midrange and 3-point range, posting up his opponents and shooting pull-up jumpers and fadeaways. Playmaking has been cited as a weakness of Leonard's—in his first eight seasons, he had never averaged more than 3.5 assists per game. Leonard improved his passing game in the 2019–20 season, logging a career high 4.9 assists per game, nearly doubling his career average.

Career statistics

NBA

Regular season

|-
| style="text-align:left;"|
| style="text-align:left;"|San Antonio
| 64 || 39 || 24.0 || .493 || .376 || .773 || 5.1 || 1.1 || 1.3 || .4 || 7.9
|-
| style="text-align:left;"|
| style="text-align:left;"|San Antonio
| 58 || 57 || 31.2 || .494 || .374 || .825 || 6.0 || 1.6 || 1.7 || .6 || 11.9
|-
| style="text-align:left; background:#afe6ba;"|†
| style="text-align:left;"|San Antonio
| 66 || 65 || 29.1 || .522 || .379 || .802 || 6.2 || 2.0 || 1.7 || .8 || 12.8
|-
| style="text-align:left;"|
| style="text-align:left;"|San Antonio
| 64 || 64 || 31.8 || .479 || .349 || .802 || 7.2 || 2.5 || style="background:#cfecec;"|2.3* || .8 || 16.5
|-
| style="text-align:left;"|
| style="text-align:left;"|San Antonio
| 72 || 72 || 33.1 || .506 || .443 || .874 || 6.8 || 2.6 || 1.8 || 1.0 || 21.2
|-
| style="text-align:left;"|
| style="text-align:left;"|San Antonio
| 74 || 74 || 33.4 || .485 || .381 || .880 || 5.8 || 3.5 || 1.8 || .7 || 25.5
|-
| style="text-align:left;"|
| style="text-align:left;"|San Antonio
| 9 || 9 || 23.3 || .468 || .314 || .816 || 4.7 || 2.3 || 2.0 || 1.0 || 16.2
|-
| style="text-align:left; background:#afe6ba;"|†
| style="text-align:left;"|Toronto
| 60 || 60 || 34.0 || .496 || .371 || .854 || 7.3 || 3.3 || 1.8 || .4 || 26.6
|-
| style="text-align:left;"|
| style="text-align:left;"|L.A. Clippers
| 57 || 57 || 32.4 || .470 || .378 || .886 || 7.1 || 4.9 || 1.8 || .6 || 27.1
|-
| style="text-align:left;"|
| style="text-align:left;"|L.A. Clippers
| 52 || 52 || 34.1 || .512 || .398 || .885 || 6.5 || 5.2 || 1.6 || .4 || 24.8
|- class="sortbottom"
| style="text-align:center;" colspan="2"|Career
| 576 || 549 || 31.3 || .493 || .384 || .858 || 6.4 || 2.9 || 1.8 || .6 || 19.2
|- class="sortbottom"
| style="text-align:center;" colspan="2"|All-Star
| 5 || 5 || 19.8 || .525 || .400 ||  || 5.8 || 3.8 || 1.2 || .2 || 15.6

Playoffs

|-
| style="text-align:left;"|2012
| style="text-align:left;"|San Antonio
| 14 || 14 || 27.1 || .500 || .450 || .813 || 5.9 || .6 || 1.2 || .4 || 8.6
|-
| style="text-align:left;"|2013
| style="text-align:left;"|San Antonio
| 21 || 21 || 36.9 || .545 || .390 || .633 || 9.0 || 1.0 || 1.8 || .5 || 13.5
|-
| style="text-align:left; background:#afe6ba;"|2014†
| style="text-align:left;"|San Antonio
| 23 || 23 || 32.0 || .510 || .419 || .736 || 6.7 || 1.7 || 1.7 || .6|| 14.3
|-
| style="text-align:left;"|2015
| style="text-align:left;"|San Antonio
| 7 || 7 || 35.7 || .477 || .423 || .771 || 7.4 || 2.6 || 1.1 || .6 || 20.3
|-
| style="text-align:left;"|2016
| style="text-align:left;"|San Antonio
| 10 || 10 || 33.9 || .500 || .436 || .824 || 6.3 || 2.8 || 2.6 || 1.4 || 22.5
|-
| style="text-align:left;"|2017
| style="text-align:left;"|San Antonio
| 12 || 12 || 35.8 || .525 || .455 || .931 || 7.8 || 4.6 || 1.7 || .5 || 27.7
|-
| style="text-align:left; background:#afe6ba;"|2019†
| style="text-align:left;"|Toronto
| 24 || 24 || 39.1 || .490 || .379 || .884 || 9.1 || 3.9 || 1.7 || .7 || 30.5
|-
| style="text-align:left;"|2020
| style="text-align:left;"|L.A. Clippers
| 13 || 13 || 39.3 || .489 || .329 || .862 || 9.3 || 5.5 || 2.3 || .8 || 28.2
|-
| style="text-align:left;"|2021
| style="text-align:left;"|L.A. Clippers
| 11 || 11 || 39.3 || .573 || .393 || .880 || 7.7 || 4.4 || 2.1 || .8 || 30.4
|- class="sortbottom"
| style="text-align:center;" colspan="2"|Career
| 135 || 135 || 35.5 || .511 || .399 || .844 || 7.9 || 2.8 || 1.8 || .7 || 21.2

College

|-
| style="text-align:left;"|2009–10
| style="text-align:left;"|San Diego State
| 34 || 33 || 31.3 || .455 || .205 || .726 || 9.9 || 1.9 || 1.4 || .7 || 12.7
|-
| style="text-align:left;"|2010–11
| style="text-align:left;"|San Diego State
| 36 || 36 || 32.6 || .444 || .291 || .759 || 10.6 || 2.5 || 1.4 || .7 || 15.5
|- class="sortbottom"
| style="text-align:center;" colspan="2"|Career
| 70 || 69 || 31.9 || .449 || .250 || .744 || 10.2 || 2.2 || 1.4 || .7 || 14.1

Awards and honors
NBA
 2-time NBA champion: 2014, 2019
 2-time NBA Finals MVP: 2014, 2019
 1-time NBA All-Star MVP: 2020
 5-time All-NBA:
 All-NBA Second Team: , 
 
 7-time All-Defensive Selection:
 NBA All-Rookie First Team: 
 NBA steals leader: 
 NBA 75th Anniversary Team (2021)

College
 Consensus second team All-American (2011)
 NABC All-American Third Team (2011)
 2× First-team All-Mountain West (2010–2011)
 2× All-Mountain West All-Tournament Team (2010–2011)
 All-Mountain West Defensive Team (2011)
 Mountain West tournament MVP (2010)
 Mountain West Freshman of the Year (2010)

High school
 California Mr. Basketball (2009)
 Martin Luther King Hall of Fame (class of 2018)

Personal life
Leonard is the son of Mark Leonard and Kim Robertson. He is the youngest child of the family and has four sisters. His father was shot and killed on January 18, 2008, at the Compton car wash he owned. Leonard insisted on playing the next evening and broke down emotionally after the game. , the murderer had still not been found. Leonard is the cousin of American football wide receiver Stevie Johnson.

Leonard and his girlfriend have two children.

In 2018, Leonard reportedly signed a multi-year endorsement deal with New Balance, the multinational sports footwear and apparel corporation. He had previously signed with Air Jordan brand, a subsidiary of Nike. In June 2019, Leonard filed a federal lawsuit against Nike. According to the lawsuit, Nike copyrighted Leonard's "Klaw" logo without his consent.

In January 2020, after the death of Kobe Bryant in a helicopter crash, Leonard revealed that he and Bryant shared the same pilot, Ara Zobayan, who also perished in the crash along with Bryant and seven others.

Leonard is known for his quiet and private demeanor. He rarely gives interviews and avoids questions about his private life. Leonard has also said that he does not actively consume news media or use social media.

On May 3, 2021, Leonard took to Instagram Live for the first time ever, chatting with high school basketball player Mikey Williams and announced that he will release a hip hop album titled Culture Jam sometime in 2021. Leonard described the project as "merging hip-hop and basketball together". He also shared a snippet of a track titled "Everything Different" featuring YoungBoy Never Broke Again and Rod Wave. The album will benefit a charitable organization created in memory of Kobe and Gigi Bryant. On July 23, 2021, he released the songs "Waves" and "Everything Different".

Leonard made a cameo in Drake's music video for "Way 2 Sexy" from the Certified Lover Boy album.

References

External links

 San Diego State Aztecs bio

1991 births
Living people
All-American college men's basketball players
American expatriate basketball people in Canada
American men's basketball players
Basketball players from Los Angeles
Indiana Pacers draft picks
Los Angeles Clippers players
National Basketball Association All-Stars
San Antonio Spurs players
San Diego State Aztecs men's basketball players
Small forwards
Basketball players from Riverside, California
Toronto Raptors players